John Paul II Centre may refer to:

 John Paul II Center for the New Evangelization
 John Paul II Center for Interreligious Dialogue

See also

 John Paul II Institute (disambiguation)